Lost & Found in Armenia is an American comedy written and directed by Gor Kirakosian, starring Jamie Kennedy and Angela Sarafyan.  The film was completed in 2012, and, was released to select US theaters and on-demand video on June 7, 2013.

Plot
A US Senator's son, Bill (Jamie Kennedy), who attempts to forget the breakup of his fiancée, is forced to vacation in Turkey with his best friends. During forced parasailing, he is caught in a plane’s tire. He falls from the plane, crashing into a barn in a small village in Armenia, where he is accused of being a Turkish-Azeri spy as he said 3 basic phrases in Turkish, and asked the locals if they were Turks.

He was locked in a basement where the locals kept watch on him. A local who could speak Turkish-Azeri was taken to interrogate him, and failed. Another local was brought to interrogate him after claiming he spoke English. However, he lied, and spoke some Italian instead. A young woman named Ani (Angela Sarafyan) comes home from Yerevan after learning English. When Grandpa Matsak (Michael Poghosyan) discovered this, she was summoned to interrogate him, which turned out to be a success. Although, Bill is saying he is American, but the locals don’t believe him.

Hovnatahn (David Tovmasyan) tries hitting on Ani, and fails. On the news, the locals find out he is an American who was declared missing in Turkey. When the news is spread, the locals go to the basement where Bill is imprisoned, only to find out he escaped. While Bill attempts to flee, and is knocked out by a rake, a manhunt is declared.

On the next day, Bill encounters Ani, and talks with her. Meanwhile, Hovnatahn, his father (who is the mayor of the village), and mother meet Ani's mother to propose an arranged marriage. It is declined when Ani comes home with Bill. She learns that the locals want him to leave.

On the next day, Ani takes Bill to her relatives graves and talks about Armenians suffering during the war in Artsakh, she is later kidnapped by Hovnatahn and his friend Bldo (Vache Tovmasyan). While they’re driving, the car’s brakes stop working. Bldo chickens out, and escapes the car. Hovnatahn and Ani crash and are kidnapped by soldiers of the Azerbaijani Army. The Azeris threaten to assault Ani in front of Hovnatahn, then kill both of them. Bill finds the post, and knocks out one Azeri soldier. He threatens to shoot the other, but fails. As the Azeri soldier is about to kill Bill, he is knocked out by Bldo who came back to save Hovnatahn and Ani.

In the night, the locals celebrate, and congratulate Bill for his heroism, and as an apology for mis-naming him as a Turkish-Azeri spy. In the morning, Bill is going home. Ani is holding back her sadness, because she loves him. In the last seconds, a silhouette of Bill is walking to Ani and embrace, starting a new relationship.

Cast
 Jamie Kennedy as Bill
 Angela Sarafyan as Ani
 Dave Sheridan as George
 Serdar Kalsin as Ahmed
 Alex Kalognomos as TV/Interview Reporter
 Jayda Berkmen as News Anchor
 Mark Geragos as himself
 Michael Poghosyan as Grandpa Matsak
 Arsen Grigoryan as Arshak
 Hrant Tokhatyan as Alexan
 Levon Haroutyunyan as Hakob
 Davit Tovmasyan as Hovnatan
 Vache Tovmasyan as Bldo

External links
 Official movie website
 Official Facebook page
 

American comedy films
2012 comedy films
Films shot in Armenia
2012 films
2010s American films